The Minyong are a sub-group of the Adi people, a tribal people living in Arunachal Pradesh, India. The Minyong are found in East Siang, Siang and West Siang district. They have originated from Riga Village. Their villages are mostly found on the right bank of river Siang (Brahmaputra), starting from Riga village to plains of Assam, Jonai. They consider Donyi-Polo as their religion but recently there has been conversion to Christianity. Minyong people are known for their bravery as they have fought war against British Expedition to the hilly region in late 19th century. They are a large sub tribe of The Adis and considered as fearsome warriors of the hills. Like any other tribes of ADI they celebrate Solung, Aran and Etor as their festivals.

Minyong like other Tani group name their offspring with prefix 'Ta' for male and 'Ya' for female, e.g. Tapang for baby boy and Yaman for baby girl earlier;However, this practice has been abandoned & changed recently.

References

Scheduled Tribes of India
Tribes of Arunachal Pradesh